Taikoo Hui or Taigu Hui may refer to:

 Taikoo Hui Guangzhou, a multi-use building complex in Guangzhou, China
 HKRI Taikoo Hui, a mixed use development in Shanghai, China

See also
Tai Koo (disambiguation)
Taikoo Li (disambiguation)
Swire Properties